The East Huntington Bridge (officially the Frank Gatski Memorial Bridge, also called the East End Bridge or the 31st Street Bridge) is a  cable-stayed bridge crossing the Ohio River at Huntington, West Virginia. It carries West Virginia Route 106 on the West Virginia approach and OH 775 on the Ohio approach.

The northern approach (from Ohio State Route 7) is the recently extended Ohio State Route 775; its southern terminus is a pair of ramps (northbound on-ramp from Fifth Avenue, southbound offramp to Third Avenue) connecting it to U.S. Route 60.

History

The history of the span dates to the early 1970s when possible routings for a future Ohio River span were being discussed. To conform to the Huntington city comprehensive plan, the alignment preferred by the city was one that connected to Interstate 64 outside of the city boundaries. Many favored a plan about one mile north of the city along WV 2.

Work began on the bridge in 1983 and was completed in August 1985 at a cost of $38 million. The designer of the bridge was Arvid Grant and Associated of Olympia, Washington and was the first bridge of its type in West Virginia. It was only the second of its kind in the United States since it utilized concrete instead of steel for its construction. It was built as a FHWA demonstration project.

The Ohio River span and approach ramps on both sides of the river completed was what was known as Phase I. Future plans involved tolling the bridge and connecting it to U.S. Route 60 four blocks east.

The bridge was renamed for Marshall University's first member of the Pro Football Hall of Fame,
Frank "Gunner" Gatski, during halftime of the Marshall-UTEP Football game on November 18, 2006.

See also
List of crossings of the Ohio River

References

External links

 East End Bridge at Bridges & Tunnels
 Video of bridge

Road bridges in West Virginia
Cable-stayed bridges in the United States
Buildings and structures in Huntington, West Virginia
Bridges over the Ohio River
Bridges completed in 1985
Transportation in Cabell County, West Virginia
Transportation in Lawrence County, Ohio
Buildings and structures in Lawrence County, Ohio
Road bridges in Ohio
Concrete bridges in the United States
Interstate vehicle bridges in the United States